The 1916–17 season was the 40th Scottish football season in which Dumbarton competed at national level, entering the Scottish Football League.  In addition Dumbarton played in the Dumbartonshire Charity Cup.

Scottish League

This was the third season of war-time football, where the playing of all other national competitions, including the Scottish Cup, were suspended.  Dumbarton finished 10th out of 20 in the league, with 35 points, 29 behind champions Celtic.

Dumbartonshire Charity Cup
Dumbarton won the trophy for the first time by beating Dumbarton Harp in the final.

Player statistics

|}

Source:

Transfers

Players in

Players out 

Source:

In addition James Arnott, John Chalmers, Alfred Gettins, Peter McFie and Arthur Murphy all played their final 'first XI' games in Dumbarton colours.

References

Dumbarton F.C. seasons
Scottish football clubs 1916–17 season